Abu Bakar bin Mohd Juah (29 April 1948 – 15 August 2020) was a Malaysian actor and former prison officer. He served as Senior Director of Taiping Prison before retiring in 2005.

Early life 
Abu Bakar Juah was born on 29 April 1948 and grew up in Taiping, Perak. He had married Rusidah Mohd Yassin in 1980 and had four children and one grandchild. He was last seen in a Malaysian television drama, Mr. Grey in 2018.

Filmography

Film

Television series

Telemovie

Illness and death
He was diagnosed with liver cancer in 2016. However, he was confirmed to be cured from stage four of colon cancer after undergoing 12 sessions of chemotherapy treatment at the Universiti Kebangsaan Malaysia Medical Centre (PPUKM).

He died at his residence in Cheras, Kuala Lumpur on the evening of 15 August 2020.

References

External links
 
 
 

1948 births
2020 deaths
Malaysian male actors
Malaysian television actors
Malaysian film actors
Malaysian prison administrators
People from Perak
Deaths from colorectal cancer